Leon Fukofuka (born 8 September 1994) is a rugby union player who currently plays as a halfback for  in New Zealand's domestic Mitre 10 Cup and is a  international.

Early career

The son of former Auckland and  Prop, Kalau Fukofuka, Leon was born and raised in West Auckland and played first XV rugby for Kelston Boys' High School, initially as a flanker before switching to halfback in year 11.   After graduating from high school, he began playing for Marist in Auckland's Premier club rugby competition and also turned out for 's sevens team.

Senior career

He was first named in Auckland's senior squad for the 2014 ITM Cup and made a total of 7 appearances in the competition, although only 3 were starts as he largely played backup to the more experienced Junior Poluleuligaga.   2015 was largely a right-off as a shoulder injury restricted him to just a solitary appearance during Auckland's run to the ITM Cup Premiership final while 2016 saw him return to full fitness and play in all 10 of Auckland's regular season games as they finished in a disappointing 5th place which saw them miss out on the play-offs.

Super Rugby

Despite his relative lack of experience, an injury to All Blacks halfback Tawera Kerr-Barlow paved the way for Fukofuka to be named in the  wider training group for the 2015 Super Rugby season. The presence of two excellent number 9s in the shape of Augustine Pulu and Brad Weber meant that Fukofuka didn't see any game time during the campaign and subsequently transferred to the  wider training group for 2016.

International

Fukofuka was selected for the New Zealand Barbarians Schools side in 2012 and 2 years later was a member of the New Zealand Under-20 side which finished 3rd at the 2014 IRB Junior World Championship in his home country where he played once and scored one try.

Super Rugby Statistics

References

1994 births
Living people
New Zealand rugby union players
Rugby union scrum-halves
Auckland rugby union players
Crusaders (rugby union) players
Rugby union players from Auckland
People educated at Kelston Boys' High School
New Zealand sportspeople of Tongan descent
Tonga international rugby union players